SingStar The Dome is a variant of the game SingStar Pop and was only released in the German-speaking countries Germany and Austria.

Track list  
 Annett Louisan – Das Spiel
 Ashlee Simpson – Pieces of Me
 Avril Lavigne – Sk8er Boi
 Beyoncé – Crazy in Love
 The Black Eyed Peas – Shut Up
 Blink 182 – What's My Age Again?
 The Dandy Warhols – Bohemian Like You
 Die Fantastischen Vier – Geboren
 Good Charlotte – I Just Wanna Live
 Hoobastank – The Reason
 Jamelia – Stop
 Joss Stone – Super Duper Love
 Keane – Somewhere Only We Know
 Kylie Minogue – In Your Eyes
 Laith Al-Deen – Alles An Dir
 Manfred Mann – Do Wah Diddy Diddy
 Martin Kesici – Angel of Berlin
 McFly – Obviously
 Natasha Bedingfield – These Words
 OutKast – Roses
 Pur – Abenteuerland
 Reamonn – Supergirl
 Robbie Williams – Let Me Entertain You
 Robbie Williams & Kylie Minogue – Kids
 Ronan Keating – Father and Son
 Rosenstolz – Willkommen
 Sister Sledge – We Are Family
 Steppenwolf – Born to Be Wild
 Tom Jones – It's Not Unusual
 The Clash – Should I Stay or Should I Go

References 

SingStar
Europe-exclusive video games
PlayStation 2 games
PlayStation 2-only games
2005 video games
Video games developed in the United Kingdom